The 10.5 cm cannon Model 1927 was a heavy field gun used by the Netherlands and Hungary during World War II. Dutch guns were known as 10-velds. Hungary purchased a license and built them as 31 Ms. Captured weapons were designated by the Wehrmacht as the schwere 10.5 cm Kanone 335(h). Four were bought by the Swedish Coastal Artillery as 10.5 cm kanon m/27s. They were later upgraded to m/34 standard as m/27-34s. They were transferred to the field artillery in 1942. The Dutch appear to have bought guns with both 40 and 42 caliber barrel lengths.

The gun was designed for motor traction with spoked steel wheels with rubber rims. The spades were removed and placed onto the trail legs for transport.

References 

 Chamberlain, Peter & Gander, Terry. Light and Medium Field Artillery. New York: Arco, 1975 
 Gander, Terry and Chamberlain, Weapons of the Third Reich: An Encyclopedic Survey of All Small Arms, Artillery and Special Weapons of the German Land Forces 1939-1945. New York: Doubleday, 1979

External links
 Dutch 10-veld on War over Holland
 discussion of the Model 27 and 34 guns on MLU Forum

World War II field artillery
Artillery of the Netherlands
105 mm artillery
Weapons and ammunition introduced in 1927